Ambassador Maria Henriëtte (Marriët) Schuurman (born 20 September 1969, in Creil, Netherlands) is the current Dutch Human Rights' Ambassador

Shuurman was formerly assigned as the NATO Secretary General's Special Representative for Women, Peace, and Security in October 2014. In this position, she was the point of contact for all aspects related to NATO’s contributions to the Women, Peace, and Security agenda.  Shuurman was also responsible for facilitating the coordination and consistency of NATO policies and activities which promote the implementation of the NATO/EAPC Policy and Action Plan on the Implementation of United Nations Security Council Resolution (UNSCR) 1325 and related Resolutions].

References

External links 
NATO/EAPC Policy and Action Plan
United Nations Security Council Resolution (UNSCR) 1325 and related Resolutions
NATO’s contributions to the Women, Peace, and Security agenda 

1969 births
Living people
Dutch women diplomats
NATO officials
People from Noordoostpolder
University of Amsterdam alumni